In comics, motion lines (also known as movement lines, action lines, speed lines, or zip ribbons) are the abstract lines that appear behind a moving object or person, parallel to its direction of movement, to make it appear as if it is moving quickly.

The use of motion lines in art is similar to the lines showing mathematical vectors, which are used to indicate direction and force. A similar effect is found in long-exposure photography, where a camera can capture lights as they move through time and space, blurred along the direction of motion. They are common in Japanese manga.

Carmine Infantino was one of the best known practitioners of motion lines, particularly in his illustration of Silver Age Flash comics.

See also
Nude Descending a Staircase, No. 2, for Marcel Duchamp's use of a painterly technique to the same effect
Grawlixes

References

Comics terminology
Linear motion